Warner Featurettes were an imprint for featurettes released by Warner Brothers. 

A featurette is a motion picture with a running time between a half hour and 50 minutes in length, too short to be labeled a feature and often considered too long to be labelled a film short.

Warner Brothers released several of these between 1953 and 1964. Although the trade periodicals like Film Daily and BoxOffice (magazine) occasionally listed the two-reel “Warner Specials” (actually Technicolor Specials and Broadway Brevities) as “featurettes”, the term usually applied to Warner shorts lasting a full half hour or longer.

Overview

A decade earlier, the studio cut down a Technicolor documentary, Pledge to Bataan, initially shown at 54 minutes in 1943, and released it as a 20 minute Technicolor Special on February 3, 1945. At the time, theater exhibitors preferred receiving their short films packaged by series.

By the 1950s, however, the success of Walt Disney and others with such series as the True-Life Adventures made the “extra length” short subject fashionable as a double bill presentation. The terms varied according to references, with a longer than usual Deep Adventure occasionally labeled a feature.

Two titles hosted by Jack Webb of Dragnet (series) fame, 24 Hour Alert and The John Glenn Story, were Academy Award nominees.

Also between 1958 and 1961, Warner Brothers produced four of The Bell Laboratory Science Series for television, but utilizing longtime short film director/writer Owen Crump.

List of titles

See also
List of short subjects by Hollywood studio#Warner Brothers

References
 
 Motion Pictures 1950-1959 Catalog of Copyright Entries 1960 Library of Congress 
 Motion Pictures 1960-1969 Catalog of Copyright Entries 1971 Library of Congress
BoxOffice back issue scans (release date information in multiple issue “Shorts Charts”)

Notes 

Warner Bros. short films